William or Bill Crouch may refer to:

William W. Crouch (born 1941), U.S. army general
William Forest Crouch (1904–1968), American director and writer of film
Bill Crouch (1910s pitcher) (1886–1945), Major League Baseball pitcher
Bill Crouch (1940s pitcher) (1907–1980), Major League Baseball pitcher
Bill Crouch (photographer), won the 1950 Pulitzer Prize for Photography
William Crouch, birth name of Scottish philosopher William MacAskill (born 1987).